Mistake Creek may refer to the following places in Australia:

Mistake Creek, Queensland, a community named after a tributary of the Belyando River
Mistake Creek, a tributary of the Edward River, Queensland 
Mistake Creek, one of several watercourses in Western Australia

See also
Mistake Creek massacre, a massacre  of Indigenous Australians at Mistake Creek, East Kimberley, Western Australia in 1915

 Mistake Creek massacre (Queensland), (aka Skull Hole massacre, Bladenburg massacre), a massacre of Indigenous Australians at Bladenburg Station, Queensland, c.1872